Nongkhai Sor.Prapatsorn; was a Thai Muay Thai fighter. He was elected Fighter of the Year in 1980.

Biography and career
Udom Suwaraphan, was born on August 31, 1954 in Mueang Nong Khai District, Nong Khai Province. He started practicing Muay Thai in at the age of 12 with his brothers in a camp close to his home. He competed over 100 times in the provinces until he was brought to Bangkok training at the Amornrat camp. Nongkhai won his Lumpinee Stadium debut by knockout in the second round but later lost on points at Rajadamnern Stadium which led him to return to the northeastern region for 2 years using the ring name "Nongkhai Amornrat" (หนองคาย อมรรัตน์).

During the year 1973 Nongkhai started using the name Sor.Prapatsorn after his camp fusionned with another one and formed the Sor.Prapatsorn camp in Bangkok.

1974 was the breakout year for Nongkhai in January he beat a Kung Fu specialist by knockout in the first round, this fight brought a lot of attention and Nongkhai went on a 9 fights winning streak before losing to Ruengsak Porntawee.

During the second half of 1970s Nongkhai fought the best fighters of his era and registered notable wins against Samersing Tianhirun, Khunponnoi Kiatsuriya, Jitti Kiatsuriya, Narongnoi Kiatbandit, Sagat Petchyindee, Vicharnnoi Porntawee, Pudpadnoi Worawut, Kaopong Sitichuchai, Ruengsak Porntawee, Padejsuk Pitsanurachan

At the peak of his career he received purses of 250,000 baht. Nongkhai was a two weight Rajadamnern Stadium champion at 126 and 130 lbs. He was chosen as the 130 lbs Thai representant for the World Martial Fesstyle Championship of 1982 in which he won the belt by knocking out his japanese opponent, Kunimasa Nagae, in the final.
 
Nongkhai Sor.Prapatsorn died on August 11, 2021 from a stroke after a long disease.

Titles and accomplishments
Rajadamnern Stadium
 1976 Rajadamnern Stadium 126 lbs Champion (4 defenses)
 1981 Rajadamnern Stadium 130 lbs Champion
World Free-style Martial Arts
 1982 WFMA 130 lbs Champion
 1982 WFMA 135 lbs Champion

Awards
 1980 Fighter of the Year
 1980 Sports Writers Association of Thailand Fight of the Year (vs. Padejsuk Pitsanurachan)

Fight record

|-  style="background:#fbb;"
| 1982- || Loss ||align=left| Tawanook Sitpoonchai || || Bangkok, Thailand || Decision || 5 ||3:00

|-  style="background:#cfc;"
| 1982-12-10 || Win ||align=left| Dave Johnston || || United States || Decision (Unanimous) ||  ||
|-
! style=background:white colspan=9 |

|-  style="background:#cfc;"
| 1982-10-15 || Win ||align=left| Dave Johnston || || Culver City, United States || Decision (Split) || 5 ||3:00

|-  style="background:#cfc;"
| 1982-06-21 || Win ||align=left| Seksan Sor.Thepittak || Rajadamnern Stadium || Bangkok, Thailand || Decision || 5 ||3:00

|-  style="background:#cfc;"
| 1982-04-28 || Win ||align=left| Kunimasa Nagae || Rajadamnern Stadium - World Free-style Martial Arts || Bangkok, Thailand || TKO (left kick)|| 2 ||1:06
|-
! style=background:white colspan=9 |

|-  style="background:#c5d2ea;"
| 1982-04-08 || No Contest ||align=left| Ruengsak Petchyindee|| Lumpinee Stadium || Bangkok, Thailand ||  ||5 ||
|-
! style=background:white colspan=9 |

|-  style="background:#fbb;"
| 1982-01-15|| Loss ||align=left| Samart Payakaroon || Lumpinee Stadium || Bangkok, Thailand || Decision || 5 || 3:00

|-  style="background:#fbb;"
| 1981-12-03 || Loss ||align=left| Padejsuk Pitsanurachan || Rajadamnern Stadium || Bangkok, Thailand || Decision || 5 ||3:00

|-  style="background:#cfc;"
| 1981-10-30 || Win ||align=left| Raktae Muangsurin || Lumpinee Stadium || Bangkok, Thailand || Decision || 5 ||3:00

|-  style="background:#fbb;"
| 1981-09-28|| Loss ||align=left| Kengkla Sitsei || Rajadamnern Stadium || Bangkok, Thailand || Decision || 5 || 3:00
|-
! style=background:white colspan=9 |

|-  style="background:#fbb;"
| 1981-08-06 || Loss||align=left| Narongnoi Kiatbandit || Rajadamnern Stadium || Bangkok, Thailand || Decision || 5 ||3:00

|-  style="background:#cfc;"
| 1981-07-02 || Win ||align=left| Kaopong Sitichuchai || Rajadamnern Stadium || Bangkok, Thailand || Decision || 5 ||3:00

|-  style="background:#fbb;"
| 1981-03-26 || Loss ||align=left| Padejsuk Pitsanurachan || Rajadamnern Stadium || Bangkok, Thailand || Decision || 5 ||3:00

|-  style="background:#cfc;"
| 1981-02-05 || Win ||align=left| Narongnoi Kiatbandit || Rajadamnern Stadium || Bangkok, Thailand || Decision || 5 ||3:00
|-
! style=background:white colspan=9 |

|-  style="background:#cfc;"
| 1980-12-18 || Win ||align=left| Padejsuk Pitsanurachan || Rajadamnern Stadium || Bangkok, Thailand || Decision || 5 ||3:00
|-
! style=background:white colspan=9 |

|-  style="background:#cfc;"
| 1980-11-07 || Win ||align=left| Kaopong Sitichuchai || Lumpinee Stadium || Bangkok, Thailand || Decision || 5|| 3:00

|-  style="background:#cfc;"
| 1980-08-20 || Win ||align=left| Raktae Muangsurin || Rajadamnern Stadium || Bangkok, Thailand || KO || 4 ||

|-  style="background:#cfc;"
| 1980-07-14 || Win ||align=left| Vicharnnoi Porntawee|| Rajadamnern Stadium || Bangkok, Thailand || Decision || 5 || 3:00

|-  style="background:#cfc;"
| 1980-05-05 || Win ||align=left| Khaosod Sitpraprom || Rajadamnern Stadium || Bangkok, Thailand || Decision || 5 || 3:00

|-  style="background:#cfc;"
| 1980-04-09 || Win ||align=left| Angel Gutierrez || Rajadamnern Stadium || Bangkok, Thailand || KO (Elbow)|| 1 ||

|-  style="background:#fbb;"
| 1980-03-05 || Loss ||align=left| Khaosod Sitpraprom || Rajadamnern Stadium || Bangkok, Thailand || Decision || 5 || 3:00

|-  style="background:#cfc;"
| 1980-01-30 || Win ||align=left| Prawit Sritham || Rajadamnern Stadium || Bangkok, Thailand || Decision || 5 || 3:00

|-  style="background:#c5d2ea;"
| 1979-11-12 || Draw ||align=left| Prawit Sritham || Rajadamnern Stadium || Bangkok, Thailand || Decision || 5 || 3:00

|-  style="background:#cfc;"
| 1979-10-11 || Win ||align=left| Ruengsak Porntawee || Rajadamnern Stadium || Bangkok, Thailand || Decision || 5 || 3:00

|-  style="background:#cfc;"
| 1979-08-23 || Win ||align=left| Tawanook Sitpoonchai || Rajadamnern Stadium || Bangkok, Thailand || Decision || 5 ||3:00

|-  style="background:#fbb;"
| 1979-07-11 || Loss ||align=left| Pannoi Sakornpitak ||  Rajadamnern Stadium || Bangkok, Thailand || Decision || 5 || 3:00

|-  style="background:#fbb;"
| 1979-05-09 || Loss ||align=left| Narongnoi Kiatbandit || Rajadamnern Stadium || Bangkok, Thailand || Decision || 5 ||3:00
|-
! style=background:white colspan=9 |

|-  style="background:#cfc;"
| 1979-03-15 || Win ||align=left| Seksan Sor.Thepittak || Rajadamnern Stadium || Bangkok, Thailand || Decision || 5 ||3:00
|-
! style=background:white colspan=9 |

|-  style="background:#cfc;"
| 1979-01-17 || Win ||align=left| Kaopong Sitichuchai || Lumpinee Stadium || Bangkok, Thailand || Decision || 5|| 3:00

|-  style="background:#fbb;"
| 1978-12-06 || Loss ||align=left| Pannoi Sakornpitak || Lumpinee Stadium || Bangkok, Thailand || Decision || 5 || 3:00

|-  style="background:#cfc;"
| 1978-11-10 || Win ||align=left| Pudpadnoi Worawut || Lumpinee Stadium || Bangkok, Thailand || Decision || 5 || 3:00

|-  style="background:#fbb;"
| 1978-09-28 || Loss ||align=left| Padejsuk Pitsanurachan || Rajadamnern Stadium || Bangkok, Thailand || Decision || 5 ||3:00

|-  style="background:#fbb;"
| 1978-07-31 || Loss||align=left| Dieselnoi Chor Thanasukarn || Rajadamnern Stadium || Bangkok, Thailand || Decision || 5 || 3:00

|-  style="background:#cfc;"
| 1978-06-21 || Win ||align=left| Seksan Sor.Thepittak || Rajadamnern Stadium || Bangkok, Thailand || Decision || 5 || 3:00
|-
! style=background:white colspan=9 |

|-  style="background:#cfc;"
| 1978-05-17 || Win ||align=left| Twanook Sitpoonchai || Rajadamnern Stadium || Bangkok, Thailand || Decision || 5 || 3:00
|-
! style=background:white colspan=9 |

|-  style="background:#cfc;"
| 1978-04-11 || Win ||align=left| Fakaew Surakosang || Lumpinee Stadium || Bangkok, Thailand || Decision || 5 || 3:00

|-  style="background:#fbb;"
| 1977-12-06 || Loss ||align=left| Jitti Muangkhonkaen || Lumpinee Stadium || Bangkok, Thailand || Decision || 5 || 3:00

|-  style="background:#cfc;"
| 1977-10-27 || Win ||align=left| Vicharnnoi Porntawee ||  || Bangkok, Thailand || Decision || 5 || 3:00

|-  style="background:#fbb;"
| 1977-08-17 || Loss ||align=left| Narongnoi Kiatbandit || Rajadamnern Stadium || Bangkok, Thailand || Decision || 5||3:00

|-  style="background:#cfc;"
| 1977-06-23 || Win ||align=left| Samersing Tianhirun || Rajadamnern Stadium || Bangkok, Thailand || Decision || 5 || 3:00
|-
! style=background:white colspan=9 |

|-  style="background:#fbb;"
| 1977-04-28 || Loss ||align=left| Vicharnnoi Porntawee || Rajadamnern Stadium || Bangkok, Thailand || Decision || 5 || 3:00
|-
! style=background:white colspan=9 |

|-  style="background:#cfc;"
| 1976-12-29 || Win||align=left| Sagat Petchyindee ||Rajadamnern Stadium || Bangkok, Thailand || Decision || 5 || 3:00

|-  style="background:#fbb;"
| 1976-11-11 || Loss ||align=left| Ruengsak Porntawee ||Rajadamnern Stadium || Bangkok, Thailand || Decision || 5 || 3:00

|-  style="background:#fbb;"
| 1976-09-27 || Loss ||align=left| Narongnoi Kiatbandit || Rajadamnern Stadium || Bangkok, Thailand || Decision || 5 ||3:00

|-  style="background:#cfc;"
| 1976-08-26 || Win ||align=left| Khunponnoi Kiatsuriya || Rajadamnern Stadium || Bangkok, Thailand || Decision || 5 ||3:00

|-  style="background:#cfc;"
| 1976-07-15 || Win ||align=left| Narongnoi Kiatbandit || Rajadamnern Stadium || Bangkok, Thailand || Decision || 5 ||3:00
|-
! style=background:white colspan=9 |

|-  style="background:#cfc;"
| 1976-06-09 || Win ||align=left| Sagat Petchyindee ||Rajadamnern Stadium || Bangkok, Thailand || Decision || 5 || 3:00

|-  style="background:#cfc;"
| 1976-04-06 || Win ||align=left| Jitti Muangkhonkaen || Lumpinee Stadium || Bangkok, Thailand || Decision || 5 || 3:00

|-  style="background:#cfc;"
| 1976-03-10 || Win ||align=left| Jintadej Sakniran ||  || Bangkok, Thailand || Decision || 5 || 3:00

|-  style="background:#cfc;"
| 1976-02-03 || Win ||align=left| Jintadej Sakniran ||  || Bangkok, Thailand || Decision || 5 || 3:00

|-  style="background:#cfc;"
| 1975-11-24 || Win ||align=left| Kaew Sitpordaeng || || Bangkok, Thailand || Decision || 5 || 3:00

|-  style="background:#cfc;"
| 1975-09-29 || Win ||align=left| Manopasak Singkrungthon || || Bangkok, Thailand || Decision || 5 || 3:00

|-  style="background:#fbb;"
| 1975-08-21 || Loss ||align=left| Jitti Muangkhonkaen ||  || Bangkok, Thailand || Decision || 5 || 3:00

|-  style="background:#fbb;"
| 1975-07-15 || Loss ||align=left| Jocky Sitkanpai || WBC Saensak vs Perico Fernandez, Huamark Stadium || Bangkok, Thailand || KO (Knee)|| 3 ||

|-  style="background:#cfc;"
| 1975-05-30 || Win ||align=left| Weerachat Sorndaneg || Rajadamnern Stadium ||Bangkok, Thailand || Decision || 5 || 3:00

|-  style="background:#fbb;"
| 1975-03-31 || Loss ||align=left| Narongnoi Kiatbandit || Rajadamnern Stadium || Bangkok, Thailand || Decision || 5 ||3:00

|-  style="background:#fbb;"
| 1975-02-27 || Loss ||align=left| Ruengsak Porntawee ||Rajadamnern Stadium || Bangkok, Thailand || Decision || 5 || 3:00

|-  style="background:#cfc;"
| 1975-01-31 || Win ||align=left| Khunponnoi Kiatsuriya || || Bangkok, Thailand || Decision || 5 || 3:00

|-  style="background:#cfc;"
| 1975-01-07 || Win ||align=left| Samersing Tianhirun || Lumpinee Stadium || Bangkok, Thailand || Decision || 5 || 3:00

|-  style="background:#fbb;"
| 1974- || Loss ||align=left| Ruengsak Porntawee ||  || Bangkok, Thailand || Decision || 5 ||3:00

|-  style="background:#cfc;"
| 1974- || Win ||align=left| ||  || Bangkok, Thailand ||  ||  ||

|-  style="background:#cfc;"
| 1974-08-22 || Win ||align=left| Kukkong Chor Suthichot|| Lumpinee Stadium || Bangkok, Thailand ||  ||  ||

|-  style="background:#cfc;"
| 1974-07-31 || Win ||align=left| Muanglai Sakkasem || Rajadamnern Stadium || Bangkok, Thailand || Decision || 5 || 3:00

|-  style="background:#cfc;"
| 1974-07-16 || Win||align=left| Katsuhiro Monoe || Lumpinee Stadium || Bangkok, Thailand || KO || 2 ||1:35

|-  style="background:#cfc;"
| 1974- || Win ||align=left| ||  || Bangkok, Thailand ||  ||  ||

|-  style="background:#cfc;"
| 1974- || Win ||align=left| ||  || Bangkok, Thailand ||  ||  ||

|-  style="background:#cfc;"
| 1974- || Win ||align=left| ||  || Bangkok, Thailand ||  ||  ||

|-  style="background:#cfc;"
| 1974- || Win ||align=left| ||  || Bangkok, Thailand ||  ||  ||

|-  style="background:#cfc;"
| 1974- || Win ||align=left| ||  || Bangkok, Thailand ||  ||  ||

|-  style="background:#cfc;"
| 1974-01-22 || Win ||align=left| Teng Oui-hong || Kung Fu vs Muay Thai, Huamark Stadium || Bangkok, Thailand || KO (body kick) || 1 || 0:30

|-  style="background:#cfc;"
| 1973-10-13 || Win||align=left| Chudaeng Sakpracha || Lumpinee Stadium || Bangkok, Thailand || Decision || 5 ||3:00 
|-
| colspan=9 | Legend:

See more
List of Muay Thai practitioners

References

1957 births
Living people
Nongkhai Sor.Prapatsorn
Nongkhai Sor.Prapatsorn